Hans Stürer (born 20 January 1900; date of death unknown) was an Austrian bobsledder who competed in the mid-1930s. He finished 13th in the two-man event at the 1936 Winter Olympics in Garmisch-Partenkirchen.

References

1900 births
Year of death missing
Austrian male bobsledders
Olympic bobsledders of Austria
Bobsledders at the 1936 Winter Olympics